Interstate 95 (I-95) is the main Interstate Highway of Florida's Atlantic Coast. It begins at a partial interchange with US Highway 1 (US 1) just south of downtown Miami and heads north past Daytona Beach, through Jacksonville, and to the Georgia state line at the St. Marys River near Becker. The route also passes through the cities of Fort Lauderdale, West Palm Beach, and Titusville.

The southernmost , from exits 1 to 87B, is known as the Miami Memorial Metropolitan (MMM) Expressway. The other  of which are unsigned as State Road 9A (SR 9A), and the remainder being the unsigned portion of SR 9.

Route description

I-95 begins its northward journey at US 1 near 32nd Road and Vizcaya station in southern Miami. It quickly interchanges with the Rickenbacker Causeway via the short unsigned SR 913 and then heads north into downtown. The short SR 970 freeway, mostly unsigned, distributes traffic to several downtown streets. On the north side of downtown, at the Midtown Interchange, I-395 heads east to the MacArthur Causeway, and the tolled SR 836 heads west to Miami International Airport. Throughout Miami-Dade County, I-95 is designated the North–South Expressway according to some maps.

After crossing I-395 and SR 836, I-95 begins to head north roughly along the alignment of Northwest 6th Avenue, lying one block east of Northwest 7th Avenue (US 441/SR 7). Just north of 36th Street (US 27/SR 25), at what has been called the 36th Street Interchange, I-95 crosses I-195, which goes east over the Julia Tuttle Causeway to Miami Beach, and SR 112, a toll road west to the airport. A two-way express lane roadway in the median begins at I-195 and SR 112, formed by ramps to and from SR 112. I-95 continues north, crossing and interchanging with many surface roads, most of which are state roads, before reaching the Golden Glades Interchange.

The complicated Golden Glades Interchange provides access between I-95 and two other freeways—the original section of Florida's Turnpike (SR 91), since bypassed by the Homestead Extension (SR 821), and the Palmetto Expressway (SR 826). Ramps are also provided to and from several surface streets—SR 826 east on 167th Street to Sunny Isles Beach, US 441 (SR 7) south on Northwest 7th Avenue and north on Northwest 2nd Avenue, and SR 9 southwest on a limited-access roadway to Northwest 27th Avenue. I-95 north to West Palm Beach, as well as SR 9 southwest to 27th Avenue, runs parallel to the Seaboard–All Florida Railway, used by CSX Transportation for cargo and freight, Tri-Rail for commuter rail, and Amtrak's Silver Star and Silver Meteor lines for intercity rail. At the Golden Glades Interchange, SR 9 merges with I-95, and I-95 is unsigned as SR 9 for the remainder of its length.

North of Miami, I-95 continues on to Fort Lauderdale, where it interchanges with I-595, providing access to Fort Lauderdale–Hollywood International Airport and Port Everglades to the east, and Broward County's western suburbs as well as I-75 northbound (via Alligator Alley) across the peninsula to the Gulf Coast to the west. In West Palm Beach, I-95 provides direct access to Palm Beach International Airport as well as downtown West Palm Beach and Palm Beach Island via SR 704 (Okeechobee Boulevard). After the interchange with CR 713, I-95 crosses over the turnpike in an extreme detour through the western reaches of Martin County before heading north toward St. Lucie County. Providing access to the western portions of Port St. Lucie via five interchanges, I-95 eventually crosses over the turnpike a final time just north of the Midway Road (CR 712) interchange. Both freeways eventually go separate ways north of Fort Pierce; I-95 continues directly along the coast; Florida's Turnpike turns west toward Orlando.

Just before the interchange with SR 70 (providing access to the turnpike), the highway widens from three to five lanes in each direction; after the interchange with SR 70, I-95 narrows to four lanes in each direction. I-95 further narrows to three lanes in each direction after its interchange with SR 614. The road soon enters Indian River County and the next major exit is with SR 60 providing access to Vero Beach. The highway soon enters Brevard County and the Space Coast of Florida, continuing past Melbourne, Viera, and Cocoa. The next major junction is SR 528 with access to Cocoa Beach, and Cape Canaveral eastbound and tolled access to Orlando to the west. Continuing north past Titusville, I-95 enters Volusia County and the city of Daytona Beach shortly afterward, where it meets with the eastern terminus of I-4. The highway passes through Flagler and St. Johns counties before it enters Duval County and the city of Jacksonville.

The Interstate passes through the heart of Jacksonville, crossing the Fuller Warren Bridge over the St. Johns River, which was rebuilt from its original drawbridge incarnation in 2002. From here to exit 353B, it is concurrent with US 17 and its unsigned designation SR 15. The stretch from here in Downtown Jacksonville south past the southern interchange with the Jacksonville Beltway, I-295, can be very congested during morning and evening rush hours, with traffic often grinding to a halt. Well over 100,000 cars use this section per day, with even higher traffic counts in some areas. Just north of the northern I-295 interchange, I-95 provides access to Jacksonville International Airport. From this point, I-95 continues north toward Nassau County with an exit for SR A1A and then into Georgia, just north of milemarker 380.

Express lanes

The current high-occupancy vehicle (HOV) lanes in both directions between I-395 in Miami and Broward Boulevard (SR 842) in Northern Miami and Fort Lauderdale are converted to HOV lanes, with two lanes in each direction. Prices vary based on congestion and peak hours and tolls are collected electronically, while registered travelers with three or more passengers and hybrid vehicles can drive the toll lanes for free. Both high-occupancy toll (HOT) lanes have been completed in both directions from I-395 to the Golden Glades Interchange (including toll gantries).

History
I-95 was initially signed in 1959, and the first section to be opened to traffic was in Jacksonville in 1960.  A year later, a short section just north of the current I-195 in Miami opened. The Miami News in 1956 touted the construction of what would become I-95 in Miami as a "slum clearance program". Most of the construction was focussed between Jacksonville and Daytona Beach in the early 1960s. Construction of the Fuller Warren Bridge cut off the historically Black Jacksonville neighborhood called Brooklyn. At the end of the decade, the highway was complete from US 17, just south of the Georgia state line to I-4 in Daytona Beach (Georgia had not completed their portion of I-95 at the time of Florida's completion). The segment from Fort Lauderdale to Miami was complete by 1970. By 1976, most of the highway was complete from the Georgia state line to Fort Pierce as well as Palm Beach Gardens to Miami.

In 2002, I-95, along with most of Florida's Interstates, switched over from a sequential exit numbering system to a mileage-based exit numbering system.

Missing Treasure Coast Link

The Bureau of Public Roads approved an I-95 alignment that used  of Florida's Turnpike from PGA Boulevard (SR 786) in Palm Beach Gardens north to SR 70 in Fort Pierce in the 1950s. In the mid-1960s, the State Road Department authorized traffic counts be conducted to determine if the separation of I-95 from the turnpike was feasible, with arguments that using a concurrent alignment was costing Florida money for federal highway funding, but not without the concern of losing toll revenue. I-95 was given a separate alignment from Florida's Turnpike in 1973.

Over time, the Interstate adopted a separate route closer to US 1, running parallel with the turnpike between Stuart and Palm Beach Gardens, and was originally scheduled to be completed in 1972. However, resistance by Martin County officials due to environmental and unwanted growth concerns delayed the highway's completion for 15 years, requiring those who wanted to travel through the Treasure Coast to take either the slower US 1 or the tolled turnpike. This section opened to traffic on December 19, 1987, with I-95 running uninterrupted from Miami to the state line.

Exit list

Mainline

Express lanes
Express lanes begin in Downtown Miami and are planned to extend as far north as Jupiter.

Auxiliary routes
: Julia Tuttle Causeway, a spur in Miami, crossing Biscayne Bay
: Beltway around Jacksonville
: Spur located north of Downtown Miami connecting to the MacArthur Causeway
: Port Everglades Expressway, between Sunrise and Fort Lauderdale
: future designation along SR 9B in southern Jacksonville

See also

Transportation in Florida
Transportation in South Florida
Transportation in Jacksonville, Florida

References

External links

Interstate 95 Florida -- SouthEastRoads.com(AARoads)
Interstate-Guide: Interstate 95

95
Expressways in Florida
95
95
95
95
95
95
95
95
95
95
95
95
95
95
95
95
95
95
95
95
95
95
95
95
95
 Florida
1957 establishments in Florida